Inspirational Exciting Television (shortened to ieTV or internationally as  ieTVTT; formerly Indian Entertainment Television) is a cable television station in Trinidad and Tobago and was the first Indo-Trinidadian and Tobagonian cable station in the country. Since the acquisition of the channel, the channel has been run under SWAHA Media Limited and broadcasts Indian cultural programming, news, current affairs and religious programming.

Availability
It is carried on channel 113 on the Flow cable system in Trinidad. Channel 116 on Blink, TSTT's IPTV service and online using Ustream.

Programming
The station's programming consists of a mix of local Indo-Trinidadian and Tobagonian programming and Indian programming from India. Programming includes SWAHA Hindu services and events, Indian singing and dancing shows, cooking shows, health shows, documentaries, kids and youth programming, talk shows, sportscasts, Islamic programs, Indian movies, and business shows. Newscasts are broadcast at 7.00am, 12.00pm, 6.30pm, and 9.30pm on weekdays and 6:30pm on Saturdays and Sundays.

References

External links

Live Stream
Detail Source

Television stations in Trinidad and Tobago